Wilhem Roumbouts is a District in Tambrauw Regency in Southwest Papua, Indonesia. Its district capital is Tabamsere.

Administrative divisions
Wilhem Roumbouts is divided into 4 villages which are:
Tabamsere
Sayam
Esyuom
Araf Mafat

Demography

Population
As of the 2020 census, the population of Wilhem Roumbouts was 179.

References

Populated places in Southwest Papua
Populated places in Tambrauw

Southwest Papua